The 2014 Rafael Nadal tennis season officially began on 30 December 2013 with the start of the 2014 Qatar ExxonMobil Open. This season saw Nadal suffer from injuries that included a back injury, a wrist injury, and appendicitis. After losing in the final of the Australian Open where he suffered from a back injury, Nadal failed to defend his titles at Indian Wells, Barcelona, and Rome. He rebounded by claiming his 9th French Open. Prior to the North American hardcourt season, Nadal would experience another injury, this time a wrist injury which forced him to withdraw from the Rogers Cup, the Western & Southern Open and the US Open where he was the defending champion. Nadal announced on 24 October that he would not be competing for rest of the season due to appendicitis and eventually underwent surgery. Despite an injury plagued season, Nadal still ended the year at No. 3 with four titles.

Year summary

Early hard court season and Australian Open

Qatar Open
Rafael Nadal won the title at 2014 Qatar Open after defeating Gaël Monfils in the final on January 4.

Australian Open
Nadal reached his third final Down Under by dispatching his old rival Roger Federer in the semi-finals with a straight set victory and by dropping only one set on the way, against Grigor Dimitrov in the quarter-finals. Victory in the final would have seen Nadal equal Pete Sampras's total of 14 major titles and also become only the third man to win all four grand slams at least twice, Roy Emerson and Rod Laver being the other two. In the final, though, he was unexpectedly beaten by Stanislas Wawrinka, who had previously never beaten Nadal or even won a set against him in 12 previous meetings. At a set and a break down, Nadal sustained a back injury that saw him swiftly lose the second set. He recovered enough to win the third and fought hard before Wawrinka prevailed in four sets.

Rio Open
Nadal won the inaugural Rio Open after beating Alexandr Dolgopolov in the final on February 23. In the semifinal a day earlier, he had to save two match points in the 3rd set tie breaker to win against Pablo Andújar.

Indian Wells Masters
Nadal next competed in the Indian Wells Masters. He received a bye in the first round and fought back from a set down to overcome Radek Stepanek in the second round. His tournament ended in the next round, though, as Alexandr Dolgopolov exacted a measure of revenge for his Rio Open final loss by dispatching Nadal in a third set tie break.

Miami Masters
After not competing in 2013, Nadal returned to Key Biscane for a chance at his first Miami Masters title. He dominated his first three opponents, losing a total of nine games combined. He then fought back from a set down to overcome Milos Raonic in the quarter-finals. In an unprecedented event both Novak Djokovic and he received walkovers from their semi-final opponents to set up their 40th clash. It was Nadal's fourth Miami final, following runner-up finishes in 2005, 2008, and 2011. Nadal would once again fail to lift the trophy, though, as Djokovic displayed near perfect form and eased his way to a two-set victory.

Spring clay court season and French Open

Monte-Carlo Masters
After finally relinquishing his Monte-Carlo crown to Novak Djokovic in 2013, Nadal returned to the red clay in an attempt to reclaim the title that had been his from 2005 to 2012. As expected the King of Clay won his first two matches with ease. His victory against Andreas Seppi in the third round brought his career clay court wins to 300, a feat achieved by only ten other players. In the quarter-finals, though, Nadal would succumb to the relentless attack of David Ferrer. It was the first time Ferrer had beaten Nadal on clay in ten years and the first time Nadal failed to reach the Monte-Carlo final since his first stint in the tournament as a qualifier in 2003.

Barcelona Open
Nadal hadn't lost a match at the Barcelona Open since 2003 and hadn't lost a set at the tournament since dropping one against David Ferrer in the 2008 final. These streaks seemed destined to continue and did against his first two opponents, both of whom he dispatched in straight sets. In the quarter-finals, Nadal's set streak ended at 44 when Nicolas Almagro took the second set of their match in a tight tiebreak. Almagro would also put an end to Nadal's win streak at 41 when he clinched the match by winning the third set as well.

Madrid Open
Nadal claimed his fourth Madrid Open crown (third on clay) by defeating Kei Nishikori in the final. Nadal was down a set and a break in the final when Nishikori began showing signs of injury. This injury aided Nadal as he fought back to win the second set and take a three-game lead in the third before Nishikori retired.

Italian Open
Nadal made his ninth final at the Italian Open and was vying for his eighth title, but was beaten in three sets by his rival Novak Djokovic in the final. In the second round, Nadal played the longest three set match of the year (thus far) by battling Gilles Simon for 199 minutes. In the third round and quarter-final, he was forced to rally from a set down to claim victory against Mikhail Youzhny and Andy Murray respectively. His loss marked the first time in ten years that he would enter into the French Open with fewer than two European clay court titles.

French Open
Despite a sub-par European clay court season, Nadal entered the second Major of the year with a 59–1 record at the event. By the end of the tournament Nadal would extend this record to 66–1 by claiming his record fifth consecutive and record ninth French Open title with a four set victory over Novak Djokovic. He won his first four rounds against Robby Ginepri, Dominic Thiem, Leonardo Mayer, and Dušan Lajović, respectively, without dropping a set. In the quarter-finals, he faced last year's finalist, David Ferrer. He dropped the opening set, his first of the tournament, but went on to win in four sets. In the semi-finals, he put on a devastating display and lost only six games as he dispatched Andy Murray in straight sets. The final was a rematch of last year's semifinal and the 2012 final as well as his 42nd match against Novak Djokovic. In winning his 9th Roland Garros title, Nadal became the only player to have won one Grand Slam for ten consecutive years.

Grass court season and Wimbledon

Halle Open
Nadal received a bye in the first round and then lost to Dustin Brown in the second round. The loss marked Nadal's third consecutive defeat on grass and dropped his record on the surface to 2–5 since he reached the 2011 Wimbledon final.

Wimbledon
Having been bounced in the second round by Lukas Rosol in 2012, the first round by Steve Darcis in 2013, and riding a three match grass losing streak, Nadal entered the 2014 edition of Wimbledon looking for redemption. His first match started off rocky as he dropped the opening set against Martin Kližan, but he recovered to win in four and snap his losing streak. Up next was his 2012 conqueror, Rosol. Rosol looked capable of pulling out the upset once again as he led by a set and a break, but Nadal righted the ship and got revenge for his 2012 defeat by pulling the match out in four. Nadal again recovered from a set down against Mikhail Kukushkin in the third round, marking the first time in his career that he won three consecutive matches after dropping the first set. Nadal went on to face 19-year-old wildcard Nick Kyrgios in the fourth round and once again dropped the opening set, but was unable to recover this time and succumbed to Kyrgios in four sets. It was Nadal's first defeat to a player born in the 1990s and the first time a teenager had beaten the World No. 1 at a Grand Slam since Nadal himself beat Roger Federer at the 2005 French Open.

Summer hard court season

Canadian Open, Cincinnati Masters, and US Open

Nadal was the defending champion of all three tournaments, but had to withdraw from each because he was unable to recover from a right wrist injury that he suffered while practicing on July 29.

Asian Swing

China Open

Nadal returned to action from his wrist injury after three months away from the tour with a dominant two set victory over Richard Gasquet. He won the next round as well, but rust and lack of training became apparent as he fell to Martin Klizan in the quarters.

Shanghai Masters

Before his opening match, Nadal announced that he had been receiving aggressive medical treatment for appendicitis in hopes of avoiding surgery until the end of the tennis season. The effects of this ailment, though, could be seen in his movement and play in his opening match as Feliciano Lopez handed him a straight set defeat.

Indoor hard court season and World Tour Finals

Swiss indoors

Nadal seemed to be back to his winning ways as he easily dispatched his first two opponents. In the quarter-finals, though, he ran into red hot 17-year-old Borna Ćorić and was beaten in straight sets.

Paris Masters and ATP World Tour Finals

After his defeat in Basel, Nadal announced that he was not in a condition to be able to compete at the level necessary to win and opted out of both the Paris Masters and the ATP World Tour Finals to have surgery for his appendicitis. It was the third time that Nadal was forced to withdraw from the ATP World Tour Finals after he had qualified.

All matches

Singles matches

Doubles matches

Exhibition matches

Tournament schedule

Singles schedule
Nadal's 2014 singles tournament schedule is as follows:

1 The symbol (i) = indoors means that the respective tournament will be held indoors.

2 The ATP numbers between brackets = non-countable tournaments.

Head-to-head matchups
Ordered by number of wins, then ranking at the time of the most recent match.
 Pablo Andujar
  Tomáš Berdych 2–0
  Andy Murray 2–0
  Kei Nishikori 2–0
  Grigor Dimitrov 2–0
  Gaël Monfils 2–0
  Lukas Rosol 2–0
  Peter Gojowczyk 2–0
  Novak Djokovic 1–2
  David Ferrer 1–1
  Roger Federer 1–0
  Milos Raonic 1–0
  Fabio Fognini 1–0
  Mikhail Youzhny 1–0
  Richard Gasquet 1–0
  Ernests Gulbis 1–0
  Gilles Simon 1–0
  Alexandr Dolgopolov 1–1
  Andreas Seppi 1–0
  Ivan Dodig 1–0
  Pablo Andujar 1–0
  Roberto Bautista Agut 1–0
  Lleyton Hewitt 1–0
  Joao Sousa 1–0
  Radek Štěpánek 1–0
  Martin Kližan 1–1
  Juan Mónaco 1–0
  Dominic Thiem 1–0
  Jarkko Nieminen 1–0
  Denis Istomin 1–0
  Teymuraz Gabashvili 1–0
  Bernard Tomic 1–0
  Mikhail Kukushkin 1–0
  Leonardo Mayer 1–0
  Tobias Kamke 1–0
  Albert Montañés 1–0
  Simone Bolelli 1–0
  Dušan Lajović 1–0
  Daniel Gimeno-Traver 1–0 
  Albert Ramos 1–0
  Pierre-Hugues Herbert 1–0
  Robby Ginepri 1–0
  Thanasi Kokkinakis 1–0
  Stanislas Wawrinka 0–1
  Nicolas Almagro 0–1
  Feliciano López 0–1
  Dustin Brown 0–1
  Nick Kyrgios 0–1
  Borna Ćorić 0–1

Finals

Singles: 7 (4–3)

Earnings

Bold font denotes tournament win.

See also
 2014 ATP World Tour
 2014 Novak Djokovic tennis season
 2014 Roger Federer tennis season
 2014 Andy Murray tennis season
 2014 Stan Wawrinka tennis season

References

External links 
 
ATP tour profile

2014 Rafael Nadal tennis season
Nadal
Nadal tennis season